The Cambrian Muav Limestone is a geologic unit within the 5-member Tonto Group. It is a resistant cliff-forming unit. The Muav consists of dark to light-gray, brown, and orange red limestone with dolomite and calcareous mudstone. The Muav Limestone is overlain in the western Grand Canyon by the late Cambrian Frenchman Mountain Dolostone. Eastward, the Frenchman Mountain Dolostone pinches out and the Mississippian Redwall Limestone, which forms prominent vertical cliffs, directly lies upon the Muav Limestone. The Devonian Temple Butte Formation fill deep paleovalleys that have been cut through the Frenchman Mountain Dolostone and into the Muav Limestone.

The Muav is in part younger than, and in-part grades into, the Bright Angel Shale, which is less erosion resistant and is categorized as a slope-forming unit. The Muav is about 350 feet thick in the east and reaches about 600 feet thick in the western part of its exposure area in the Grand Canyon.  The two units lie above the erosion-resistant cliff-forming Tapeats Sandstone.

In the eastern canyon, the Tapeats Sandstone creates the extremely horizontal Tonto Platform. In west Grand Canyon, the north-south Toroweap Fault is the west perimeter of the Tonto Platform, and west Grand Canyon is dominated by the erosion resistant unit of the Esplanade Sandstone.  The Tonto Trail is a mostly horizontal trail on the south side of Granite Gorge, on the Tonto Platform.

The Tonto Group units were deposited on an ancient erosion surface (angular unconformity) on the Vishnu Basement Rocks. The Vishnu sequence has a dip of about 45 degrees. As this long-timeframe unconformity represents about 1,000 million years (1.0 billion years) of non–deposition, tectonic activity and erosion, on the Vishnu Basement Rocks, is called the Great Unconformity.

Beyond the Grand Canyon area the Muav occurs in southern Utah, southern Nevada and southern California. In the California occurrence it is known as the Muav Marble.

Geologic sequence
The units of the Tonto Group:
 5 – Frenchman Mountain Dolostone
 4 – Muav Limestone
 3 – Bright Angel Shale
 2 – Tapeats Sandstone (start of transgression series)
 1 – Sixtymile Formation

Gallery – Muav Limestone

See also
 Geology of the Grand Canyon area

References

Further reading
 Blakey, and Ranney, 2008. Ancient Landscapes of the Colorado Plateau, Ron Blakey, Wayne Ranney, c 2008, Grand Canyon Association (publisher), 176 pages, with Appendix, Glossary, Index. Contains approximately 75 shaded topographic maps, for geology, etc., with 54 (23 pairs, (46)) for Colorado Plateau specifically; others are global, or North American.
 Arizona Geological Society, Arizona Geological Survey, c. 1998 (etc.) Geologic Highway Map of Arizona. Contains geologic map, Arizona Shaded Relief Map, Geologic Cross Sections, Shaded Relief Map of Arizona, Geologic Map of the Grand Canyon in the Vicinity of the South Rim Visitor Center, etc.

External links

 Abbot, W, (2001) Revisiting the Grand Canyon – Through the Eyes of Seismic Sequence Stratigraphy. Search and Discovery Article # 40018, America Association of Petroleum Geologists, Tulsa, Oklahoma.
 Anonymous (2006a) Tonto Group, Stratigraphy of the Parks of the Colorado Plateau. U.S. Geological Survey, Reston, Virginia.
 Anonymous (2006b) Tapeats Sandstone, Stratigraphy of the Parks of the Colorado Plateau. U.S. Geological Survey, Reston, Virginia.
 Anonymous (2006c) Bright Angel Shale, Stratigraphy of the Parks of the Colorado Plateau. U.S. Geological Survey, Reston, Virginia.
 Anonymous (2006d) Muav Limestone, Stratigraphy of the Parks of the Colorado Plateau. U.S. Geological Survey, Reston, Virginia.
 Hartman, J. H. (2001) Muav Limestone, Grand Canyon National Park, Coconino County, Arizona. GeoDIL, A Geoscience Digital Image Library, University of North Dakota, Grand Forks, North Dakota.
 Mathis, A., and C. Bowman (2007) The Grand Age of Rocks: The Numeric Ages for Rocks Exposed within Grand Canyon, Grand Canyon National Park, Arizona, National Park Service, Grand Canyon National Park, Arizona.
 Noble, L. F. (1923a) Unconformity between Temple Butte limestone and Muav limestone, Coconino County, Arizona, Plate 22-A.  U.S. Geological Survey Photographic Library, Reston, Virginia.
 Noble, L. F. (1923b) Unconformity between Temple Butte limestone and Muav limestone, Coconino County, Arizona, Plate 22-B.  U.S. Geological Survey Photographic Library, Reston, Virginia.
 Noble, L. F. (1923c) Unconformity between Temple Butte limestone and Muav limestone, Coconino County, Arizona, Plate 23-A.  U.S. Geological Survey Photographic Library, Reston, Virginia.
 Rowland, S. (nda) Frenchman Mountain and the Great Unconformity. Department of Geoscience, University of Nevada, Las Vegas, Nevada.
 Rowland, S. (ndb) Geologic Map of Frenchman Mountain. Department of Geoscience, University of Nevada, Las Vegas, Nevada.
 Stamm, N. (2013) Geologic Unit Muav (Limestone), National Geologic Database. U.S. Geological Survey, Reston, Virginia.
 Timmons, S. S. (2003) Learning to Read the Pages of a Book (Grand Canyon Geology Training Manual), National Park Service, Grand Canyon National Park, Arizona.

Limestone formations of the United States
Natural history of the Grand Canyon
Geologic formations of Arizona
Geologic formations of Nevada
Cambrian Arizona
Cambrian Nevada
Cambrian System of North America